United Nations Security Council resolution 705, adopted unanimously on 15 August 1991, after considering a note by the Secretary-General, the Council decided that compensation paid by Iraq to the United Nations Compensation Commission arising from Resolution 687 (1991) should not exceed 30 per cent of the annual value of its exports of petroleum and petroleum products.

The resolution, passed under Chapter VII of the United Nations Charter, allowed Iraq to export oil in return for humanitarian aid; however this resolution, along with Resolution 712, were both initially rejected by Iraq. Oil exports from Iraq were banned after its invasion of Kuwait on 2 August 1990.

See also
 Foreign relations of Iraq
 Gulf War
 Sanctions against Iraq
 List of United Nations Security Council Resolutions 701 to 800 (1991–1993)
 United Nations Security Council Resolution 706

References

External links
 
Text of the Resolution at undocs.org

 0705
 0705
1991 in Iraq
August 1991 events